Ruger American may refer to any of the following products produced by Sturm, Ruger & Co.:

Ruger American Pistol, a line of polymer-framed centerfire pistols
Ruger American Rifle, a line of centerfire bolt-action rifles
Ruger American Rimfire, a rimfire variant of the Ruger American Rifle